The second government of Emiliano García-Page was formed on 8 July 2019, following the latter's election as President of the Junta of Communities of Castilla–La Mancha by the Cortes of Castilla–La Mancha on 3 July and his swearing-in on 5 July, as a result of the Spanish Socialist Workers' Party (PSOE) emerging as the largest parliamentary force at the 2019 regional election with an absolute majority of seats.

The cabinet comprises members of the PSOE and a number of independents.

Investiture

Cabinet changes
García-Page's second government saw a number of cabinet changes during its tenure:
On 6 April 2021, the Social Welfare minister, Aurelia Sánchez Navarro, vacated the office following her election as regional senator to the Cortes Generales. She was replaced in her cabinet post by Bárbara García Torijano.

Council of Government
The Junta of Communities of Castilla–La Mancha is structured into the offices for the president, the vice president and nine ministries.

Notes

References

2019 establishments in Castilla–La Mancha
Cabinets established in 2019
Cabinets of Castilla–La Mancha